Justine De Jonckheere (born 24 March 1992) is a Belgian model and beauty pageant titleholder who was crowned Miss Belgium 2011 and represented her country in the Miss Universe 2011 and Miss World 2011 pageants.

Early life
Born in Menen, De Jonckheere lives in Wevelgem and is an only child. She is studying law at KULAK - Kortrijk University and speaks Dutch, French and English.

Modelling
She competed at Miss Belgium on 9 January 2011 in Knokke-Heist. She won the contest, gaining the right to represent Belgium in Miss Universe 2011 and Miss World 2011.

At the Miss Universe 2011 pageant, De Jonckheere represented her country. In the contest, which was broadcast live from São Paulo, Brazil on 12 September 2011, she and 88 other models participated, but De Jonckheere failed to reach the Top 16.

References

External links

 Miss Belgium official website

1992 births
Living people
Belgian beauty pageant winners
Miss Universe 2011 contestants
Miss World 2011 delegates
People from Menen
Miss Belgium winners
Flemish models